Lullabies of the World (tr.:Kolubelnyye mira) is a Russian animated project begun in 2005, whose goal is to create animated music videos to musical performances of lullabies (in their original languages) from countries around the world. All of the films are directed by Yelizaveta Skvotsova. It is made at Metronome Studio and supported by the Federal Agency for Culture and Cinematography of the Russian Federation.

60 lullabies are currently completed. The project has received high critical praise within Russia and won a number of awards at film festivals.

List of lullabies

Awards
 2006—Malescorto International Short Film Festival: "Best Non Live Action Film"
 2006—Window to Europe: "Grand Prix" in the Animation Competition
 2006—11th International "Golden Fish" Festival of Children's Animation: "Special Prize"
 2006—Stalker Film Festival: "UNICEF Prize for Reflecting the Theme of Children's Rights in Cinematography" 
 2007—White Elephant National Award of Film Critics and Reviewers: "Best Animated Project of 2006"
 2007—XIV KROK International Animated Films Festival: Karelian Lullaby, Special Diploma for "Elegance of the Lullaby Design" 
 2008—13th Open Russian Festival of Animated Film: "Best Series"

See also
 History of Russian animation

References

External links
 Official website
 
 Series profile at Animator.ru (incomplete listing)
 Series creator's "self-portrait" 

Film series introduced in 2005
2006 films
Films based on nursery rhymes
Russian animated films
Animated film series